The 2018–19 Seton Hall Pirates men's basketball team represented Seton Hall University in the 2018–19 NCAA Division I men's basketball season. They were led by ninth-year head coach Kevin Willard. The Pirates played their home games at the Prudential Center in Newark, New Jersey and Walsh Gymnasium in South Orange, New Jersey as members of the Big East Conference. They finished the season 20-14, 9-9 for a 4 way tie for 3rd place. In the Big East tournament, they defeated Georgetown in the Quarterfinals, Marquette in the semifinals before losing to Villanova in the championship. They received a at-large bid to the NCAA Tournament where they lost in the First Round to Wofford.

Previous season
The Pirates finished the 2017–18 season 22–12, 10–8 in Big East play to finish in a three-way tie for third place. In the Big East tournament, they lost to Butler in the quarterfinals. They received an at-large bid to the NCAA tournament as the No. 8 seed in the Midwest region. There they defeated NC State in the First Round before losing to Kansas in the Second Round.

Offseason

Departures

Incoming transfers

Class of 2018 recruits

Roster

Schedule and results

|-
!colspan=9 style=| Exhibition

|-
!colspan=9 style=| Non-conference regular season

|-
!colspan=9 style=|Big East regular season

|-
!colspan=9 style="|Big East tournament

|-
!colspan=9 style="|NCAA tournament

References

Seton Hall
Seton Hall Pirates men's basketball seasons
Seton Hall
Seton Hall
Seton Hall